Tom Whalen (born October 28, 1948) is an American writer and scholar.

Education and career
Whalen graduated from the University of Arkansas (Fayetteville) in 1970 with a B.A. in English, and earned a M.A. in writing from Hollins College (Virginia) in 1971.

He attended Tulane University in 1974 and the University of California, Berkeley, in 1981. In 2008 he received a Ph.D. in American Literature from Freiburg University, Germany where he was a visiting professor in North American Studies. Whalen also was a visiting professor in American Film and Literature 2006–09 at the University of Stuttgart. Whalen also was the Director of Creative Writing at the New Orleans Center for Creative Arts. Whalen's fiction has been praised for its "inventive, distinctive language."

In 2005, he wrote the screenplay for the 2007 animated film Flatland, based on the novel of the same name. In 2008, he taught a film class at the Staatliche Akademie der Künste Stuttgart.

Honors and distinctions 
 Caketrain Chapbook Competition, 2006.
 Texas Review Press Novella Award, 1996.
 The Missouri Review Editor's Prize (Essay), 1993.
 Distinguished Teacher, Presidential Scholars Commission, 1984, 1994.
 Pro Helvetia (Switzerland) Research Grants Summer 1988 and Summer 1990.
 Louisiana Artist Fellowship in Literature, 1985.
 New Orleans Public Schools Teacher of the Year, 1984.
 National Endowment for the Humanities Grant, SUNY-Buffalo, Summer 1984.
 Outstanding Arts Teacher, Rockefeller Brothers Fund, 1984.
 McNeese State University Research Grant, 1976.
 Hollins College Fellowship, 1970–71.

Works

Novels
 The Camel's Back. With Michael Presti. New Orleans and Tuscaloosa: Portals Press, 1993.
 Roithamer's Universe. New Orleans: Portals Press, 1996.
 A Newcomer's Guide to the Afterlife: On the Other Side Known Commonly As "The Little Book." With Daniel Quinn. New York: Bantam Books, 1997.
 The President in Her Towers. New York: Ellipsis Press, 2012.
 The Straw That Broke. San Francisco: Black Scat Books, 2014.

Short fiction
 The Eustachia Stories: An Astroromance. Illustrations by Linda Francis. California: Velocities. 1985.
 Elongated Figures. New York: Red Dust, 1991.
 The Baby. Black River Falls, WI: Obscure Publications, 2001.
 Report from the Dump. Black River Falls, WI: Obscure Publications, 2001.
 The Internecine Wars: from THE PRESIDENT IN HER TOWERS: Black River Falls, WI: Obscure Publications, 2001.
 Concerning the Vampire. Black River Falls, WI: Obscure Publications, 2001.
 Twenty-Six Novels. Black River Falls, WI: Obscure Publications, 2001.
 The Cosmic Messenger: from TALES FROM THE HYBRID POOL. Black River Falls, WI: Obscure Publications, 2002.
 Memoirs from a Mousehole: from THE STRAW THAT BROKE. Black River Falls, WI: Obscure Publications, 2002.
 Quantum Surge in O Central. Black River Falls, WI: Obscure Publications, 2003.
 An Exchange of Letters. Richmond Hill, Ontario, Canada: Parsifal Press, 2007.

Poetry
The Spare Key. Seventeen Poems. Nacogdoches, Texas: The Seven Deadly Sins Press, 1977.
The Lonely Person's Garden. Prose Poetry. Nacogdoches, Texas: The Seven Deadly Sins Press, 1980.
Winter Coat. New York: Red Dust, 1998.
The Wrong Mistake. Black River Falls, WI: Obscure Publications, 2001.
Strange Alleys: Prose Poems. Illustrations by Nick Wadley. Black River Falls, WI: Obscure Publications, 2004.IV.
Green Man and the Priests. Black River Falls, WI: Obscure Publications, 2007.
Dolls: Prose Poems. Pittsburgh, PA: Caketrain Press, 2007.

Criticism
"What an Edifice of Artifice!": Russell H. Greenan's It Happened in Boston?. Black River Falls, WI: Obscure Publications, 2008.
It's What We Do Best: Essays on War Films by Godard, Malick, and Carpenter. Black River Falls, WI: Obscure Publications, 2009.
A Bucket of Maggots, A Can of Worms: Methods of Order in Greenan's Macabre Collage. College Hill Review No. 7, Spring 2011.
The Birth of Death and Other Comedies: The Novels of Russell H. Greenan. Normal, IL: Dalkey Archive, Spring 2011.

References

External links 
 

1948 births
Living people
American male writers
University of Arkansas alumni
Hollins University alumni
University of Freiburg alumni